Orliński (feminine: Orlińska; plural: Orlińscy) is a Polish surname. Notable people with this surname include:

 Bolesław Orliński (1899–1992), Polish aviator
 Richard Orlinski (born 1966), French artist
 Jakub Józef Orliński (born 1990), Polish opera singer
 Piotr Orliński (born 1976), Polish footballer
 Wojciech Orliński (born 1969), Polish writer

See also
 

Polish-language surnames

de:Orlinski
pl:Orliński
ru:Орлинский